MADS Theatre is located in Macclesfield, Cheshire, England.

History
The theatre was founded on 15 October 1947 and since then has produced hundreds of productions. The location originally hosting a Sunday School in Lord Street built in 1822 still has the inscription over the main theatre entrance bearing the date of the first building on the site. In 1994 the theatre became a Grade 2 listed building.

Notable productions
In 2016 MADS Theatre company performed six short plays by Tennessee Williams, also in 2016 MADS took part in Barnaby Festival.

At the 2016 British All Winners Drama festival held at the Hertford Theatre MADS production of The Hound of the Baskervilles by Sir Arthur Conan Doyle, adapted by Steve Canny & John Nicholson won the Felixstowe Festival Trophy (Adjudicator's Award) and the Sydney Fisher Trophy (Backstage Trophy).

In 2017, MADS' production of Jerusalem by Jez Butterworth won best production at the Greater Manchester Drama Festival (GMDF).

Marshall Lancaster and Jonathon Morris have been members.

References

External links

Macclesfield
Amateur theatre companies in England
Culture in Cheshire
Organisations based in Cheshire